The current incarnation of  E! is a Canadian English language specialty channel owned by Bell Media. Based on the American cable network of the same name, E! is devoted to entertainment programming including news, film, television, celebrities and fashion. NBCUniversal licenses the name and programming for the channel under a brand licensing agreement, but it doesn't hold an ownership interest.

The network was originally launched in 1999 as the similarly formatted Star!, under the ownership of CHUM Limited. In 2010, the channel reached a deal to license the name and branding of the U.S. E! network (following a short-lived incarnation as a television system formerly known as CH).

History
The channel was licensed in 1996 by the Canadian Radio-television and Telecommunications Commission and was launched on September 10, 1999 as Star!, which was originally owned by CHUM Limited.

In July 2006, Bell Globemedia (later renamed CTVglobemedia) announced that it would purchase CHUM for an estimated $1.7 billion CAD, including Star!. The sale was subject to CRTC approval and was approved in June 2007, with the transaction completed on June 22, 2007. That fall, Star!'s daily entertainment news program Star! Daily was cancelled and replaced with its CTV-produced competitor, etalk. As a result of the changes, the Citytv stations were sold to Rogers Media that same year.

The channel broadcast programming from the equivalent American cable channel E! until 2007 (thus the likely nod to that agreement with the exclamation mark as part of its name), when that channel licensed its name to Global's secondary television system CH and transferred its programming to that service, which became known as E!. Although the broadcast version of E! Canada ceased operations in 2009, Canwest is believed to have retained Canadian rights to E! (U.S.) programming (despite not airing it on any of its channels), preventing these series from returning to Star! Instead, the channel's schedule in these years consisted mostly of second-run talk shows and entertainment news shows repeated from CTV and its secondary A system (formerly A-Channel, now CTV Two), including FashionTelevision, The Tonight Show with Jay Leno, The Ellen DeGeneres Show and TMZ.

On November 1, 2010, CTVglobemedia announced it had signed a multi-year and multi-platform deal with Comcast, to return the E! brand back to Canada. Under the agreement, Star! was relaunched as E!: Entertainment Television on November 29, 2010. Ownership changed hands again, when on April 1, 2011, Bell Canada gained full control of E! as a result of a takeover of CTVglobemedia, with the latter company becoming known as Bell Media.

At E! U.S's upfronts presentation on April 30, 2012, the network unveiled a new logo and slogan, "Pop of Culture", to debut on July 9, 2012. On the same day, Bell announced that the Canadian version of the channel would adopt E!'s new branding on the same day as its debut in the U.S.

HD simulcast 
On July 12, 2012, Bell Media launched a high definition simulcast feed of E!. It is currently available through most major television providers.

Logos

Programs

While E! is very similar to its American counterpart, it also incorporates reruns of shows that have aired on other Bell Media services including, CSI: Crime Scene Investigation, Reign, Being Human, and Supernatural.

References

External links

E! System - Canadian Communications Foundation

Bell Media networks
E! Canada
E!
Analog cable television networks in Canada
Television channels and stations established in 1999
English-language television stations in Canada
1999 establishments in Canada